Jan Ivar Pedersen (born 24 February 1936) is a Norwegian professor of nutrition.

He grew up in Karmøy and took his secondary education at Lycée Corneille in France. He took the cand.med. degree in 1962 and the dr.med. degree in 1973, both at the University of Oslo. He has been employed at the University of Oslo since 1964, and was promoted to professor in 1984. He has also been a member of the Norwegian National Council on Nutrition. He is a member of the Norwegian Academy of Science and Letters since 1988 and is a Knight, First Class of the Order of St. Olav since 2007.

He is married and has two children, and resides at Stabekk.

References

1936 births
Living people
People from Karmøy
Norwegian expatriates in France
University of Oslo alumni
Academic staff of the University of Oslo
Nutritionists
Members of the Norwegian Academy of Science and Letters
Lycée Pierre-Corneille alumni